Colette Rolland (born 1943, in Dieupentale, Tarn-et-Garonne, France) is a French computer scientist and Professor of Computer Science in the department of Mathematics and Informatics at the University of Paris 1 Pantheon-Sorbonne, and a leading researcher in the area of information and knowledge systems, known for her work on meta-modeling, particularly goal modelling and situational method engineering.

Biography 
In 1966 she studied applied mathematics at the University of Nancy, where she received her PhD in 1971. In 1973 she was appointed Professor at the University of Nancy, Department of Computer Science. In 1979 she became professor at University of Paris 1 Pantheon-Sorbonne Department of Mathematics and Informatics. 
She has been involved in a large number of European research projects and used to lead cooperative research projects with companies. She is currently Professor Emeritus of Computer Science in the department of Mathematics and Informatics.

Rolland is in the editorial board of a number of journals including Journal of Information Systems,  Journal on Information and Software Technology,  Requirements Engineering Journal,  Journal of Networking and Information Systems, Data and Knowledge Engineering Journal, Journal of Data Base Management and Journal of Intelligent Information Systems. She is the French representative in IFIP TC8 on Information Systems and has been the co chair and chairperson of the IFIP WG8.1 during nine years.

Rolland has been awarded a number of prizes including the IFIP Silver Core, IFIP service award, the Belgium prize ‘de la Fondation Franqui’ and the European prize of ‘Information Systems’.

Work 
Roland's research interests are in the areas of information modeling, databases, temporal data modeling, object-oriented analysis and design, requirements engineering and specially change engineering, method engineering, CASE and CAME tools, change management and enterprise knowledge development.

Publications 
Rolland is the co-author of 7 textbooks; editor of 25 proceedings and author or co-author of over 280 invited and referred papers.

 Books, a selection:
 1991. Automatic Tools for Designing Office Information Systems: The Todos Approach. Research Reports ESPRIT, Project 813, Todos, Vol. 1. With B. Pernici.
 1992. Information System Concepts: Improving the Understanding, Proceedings. With Eckhard D. Falkenberg. IFIP Transactions a, Computer Science and Technology.
 1993. Advanced Information Systems Engineering. With F. Bodart. Springer.
 1994. A Natural Language Approach For Requirements Engineering. With C. Proix.
 1996. Facilitating "Fuzzy to Formal" Requirements Modelling. With Janis Bubenko, P. Loucopoulos and V. Deantonellis.
 1988. Temporal Aspects in Information Systems. With F. Bodart. Elsevier Science Ltd.
 1998. A framework of information system concepts. The FRISCO report. With Eckhard D. Falkenberg, Paul Lindgreen, Björn E. Nilsson, J.L. Han Oei, Ronald Stamper, Frans J M Van Assche, Alexander A. Verrijn-Stuart and Klaus Voss.
 1998. "A proposal for a scenario classification framework". With others. In: Journal of. Requirements Engineering. vol. 3 pp. 23–47 – Springer Verlag, 1998
 2000. Engineering information systems in the Internet context: IFIP TC8/WG8.1. With Sjaak Brinkkemper and Motoshi Saeki.
 2005. "Modeling Goals and Reasoning with Them" with Camille Salinesi, in Engineering and Managing Software Requirements, edited by Aybüke Aurum and Claes Wohlin, Springer:Berlin/Heidelberg, p. 189‑217.
 2005. "Measuring the fitness relationship" with Anne Etien, Requirements Engineering, vol. 10, p. 184‑197, 2005.

Papers, a selection:
 1998. "A proposal for a scenario classification framework". With others. In: Journal of. Requirements Engineering. vol. (3) pp. 23–47 – Springer Verlag, 1998
 2005. "Map-driven Modular Method Re-engineering: Improving the RESCUE Requirements Process". CAiSE Short Paper Proceedings 2005 with Jolita Ralyté et al.
 2006. "Intentional Cognitive Models with Volition". With Ammar Qusaibaty, Newton Howard
 2007. "Capturing System Intentionality with Maps", in Conceptual Modelling in Information Systems Engineering, edited by John Krogstie, Andreas Opdahl and Sjaak Brinkkemper, Springer:Berlin/Heidelberg, p. 141‑158.
 2007. "On the Adequate Modeling of Business Process Families". With Naveen Prakash. Paper 8th Workshop on Business Process Modeling, Development, and Support.
 2008. Requirements engineering: foundation for software quality : 14th international working conference, REFSQ 2008, Montpellier, France, June 16–17, 2008 : proceedings. With Barbara Paech (eds.). 
 2008. "Towards Engineering Purposeful Systems: A Requirements Engineering Perspective", in Database and Expert Systems Applications,  edited by S. S. Bhowmick, J. Küng and R. Wagner, Lecture Notes in Computer Science, vol. 5181, Springer:Berlin/Heidelberg, p. 1‑4.
 2009. "Exploring the Fitness Relationship between System Functionality and Business Needs", in Design Requirements Engineering: A Ten-Year Perspective, edited by Kalle Lyytinen, Pericles Loucopoulos, John Mylopoulos and Bill Robinson, Lecture Notes in Business Information processing, Springer:Berlin/Heidelberg, p. 305‑326.
 2009. "Method engineering: towards methods as services", Software Process: Improvement and Practice, vol. 14, no 3, p. 143‑164.
 2010. "An Intentional Approach to Service Engineering" with Manuele Kirsch-Pinheiro and Carine Souveyet, IEEE Transactions on Services Computing, vol. 3, p. 292‑305, 2010.
 2013. Seminal Contributions to Information Systems Engineering: 25 Years of CAiSE. With Janis Bubenko, John Krogstie, Óscar Pastor, Barbara Pernici, Colette Rolland, Arne Sølvberg (eds.).

References

External links 
  home page
 REMORA by Colette Rolland  , Virtual Exhibitions in Informatics at uni-klu.ac.at

1943 births
Living people
French computer scientists
Enterprise modelling experts
Information systems researchers
French women computer scientists
Academic staff of the University of Paris
Nancy-Université alumni
Academic staff of Nancy-Université
Academic staff of Paris-Sorbonne University